The Swindlers is a 2017 South Korean crime action film directed by Jang Chang-won. The film stars Hyun Bin, Yoo Ji-tae, Bae Seong-woo, Park Sung-woong, Nana and Ahn Se-ha.

Plot
A con artist who had been reported dead after committing a grand fraud case is rumored to be alive. A prosecutor, Park, who was in collusion with the con man needs to eliminate him to avoid a corruption scandal. When tracking down the con man, Park meets another fraudster named Ji-sung who is also after the same man for a personal revenge. Realizing their mutual goals, they decide to team up, but with hidden motives.

Cast
Hyun Bin as Hwang Ji-sung
Yoo Ji-tae as Prosecutor Park Hee-soo
Bae Seong-woo as Go Seok-dong 
Park Sung-woong as Kwak Seung-gun
Nana as Choon-ja
Ahn Se-ha as Chief Kim
Choi Deok-moon as Lee Kang-suk 
Choi Il-hwa as Lawmaker Sung
Heo Sung-tae as Jang Du-chil 
Kim Tae-hoon as Attorney general
Jung Jin-young as Hwang Yoo-suk (special appearance)
Oh Tae-kyung as Tae-dong (special appearance)
Cha Soon-bae as CEO Kang (special appearance)
Jin Seon-kyu as Older cousin (special appearance)

Release and reception

Local
The Swindlers opened in South Korea on November 22, 2017, grossing  from 213,185 admissions on the first day of its release.

The film topped the local box office for three consecutive weeks.
 
By December 19, 2017, The Swindlers exceeded 4 million in cumulative attendance, and collected  in total.

International
The film was released internationally in ten territories: Australia, New Zealand, North America, Hong Kong, Macao, Taiwan, Japan, Britain and the Philippines.

Awards and nominations

References

External links

 
 

2017 crime action films
2017 films
South Korean crime action films
Showbox films
2017 directorial debut films
2010s South Korean films